The Aberdare Range (formerly the Sattima Range, Kikuyu: Nyandarua) is a  long mountain range of upland, north of Kenya's capital Nairobi with an average elevation of . It straddles across the counties of Nyandarua, Nyeri, Muranga, Kiambu and Laikipia. The mountain range is located in west central Kenya, northeast of Naivasha and Gilgil and lies just south of the Equator. The mountain range is called Nyandarua among the Agikuyu people in whose territory this forest and mountain range is located. The name Nyandarua comes from the Kikuyu word rwandarua meaning a drying hide, due to the distinctive fold of its silhouette.

Topology
The Aberdare Range forms a section of the eastern rim of the Great Rift Valley running roughly north to south.
On the west, the range falls off steeply into the Kinangop Plateau and then into the Great Rift Valley. On the east, the range slopes more gently. Lake Naivasha and the distant Mau Escarpment can be seen from peaks in the range.

The former name of the range survives in Mount Satima ("the mountain of the young bull"), the highest peak in the Aberdare Range.
Mount Kenya,  the second highest mountain in Africa after Kilimanjaro lies east of the Aberdare Range.

The Aberdares are the water catchment area for the Sasumua dam and the Ndakaini dam, which provide most of the water for Nairobi. The mountain forests are catchment areas for the Tana River, the largest river in Kenya, supplying water to the Seven Forks hydroelectric power complex which generates over 55 percent of Kenya's total electricity output.

Ecology
The main ecosystems within the mountain range are rainforest giving way to dense bamboo forests and then moorland.
The steep western edges of the hillside are sparsely inhabited by wildlife compared to the forested gentle slopes to the east, which are home to a wide variety of wildlife. There are multitudes of elephant, buffalo, giant forest hog, hyena as well as the endangered black rhino and bongo. A variety of cats including leopards, servals, civet, genet and the rare African golden cat. Other threatened species including the Jackson mongoose, the black and white colobus monkey and Sykes' monkey are plentiful, as are waterbuck, reedbuck, duikers, and bushbuck.

The Aberdares contain a rich diversity of vegetation. There are 778 vegetation and plant species, subspecies and varieties found in the Aberdare National Park, due to the park's altitude and rainfall.  Hardwood trees include camphor, cedar, podo and hagenia.

Much of the range has been protected within the Aberdare National Park since its creation in 1950. The range attracts large numbers of hikers and climbers operating out of the main centers of Naivasha and Gilgil. The lower slopes are farmed, higher areas are known for their wildlife. The Rhino Charge is an annual event run by conservationists in Kenya to pay for fencing of the Aberdare National Park as a means of protecting East Africa's largest indigenous forest from destruction.

Aberdare Ranges Forest
The Ranges descend gradually from the peak towards Nyahururu from the northern side, where incised river valleys and volcanic vents are evident. On the southern side, the ranges are steep southwards from IL Kinangop peak towards the northern part of Murang’a North District.

Rivers
The major rivers from the Aberdare Forest are the Athi and the Tana, which flow into the Indian Ocean, the Ewaso Nyiro that drains into the Lorian Swamp and the River Malewa that drains into Lake Naivasha. The ranges also have several tributaries, and higher up are bog markings that are the source of the rivers on the moorlands and afro-alpine. The Athi, Lake Naivasha, Tana and Ewaso Nyiro river basins have their source in Aberdare Forest Reserve.

Ecosystems
Endemic plants on the forest include Lobelia deckeniisspsattimae, Helichrysum gloria-dei and Alchemilla hageniae. The forest has four vegetation zones including subalpine vegetation, xeromorphic evergreen forest, montane humid forest, and submontane forest.

Sub alpine vegetation
Found at altitudes above  is the moorlands. Alpine grass (Deschampsia), distinguished by giant groundsell (Dendrosenecio johnstonii), Lobelia deckenii, and heath (Erica excelsa). Moorland communities are the main vegetation in this region.

Montane humid forest
This belt is mostly dominated by pioneer species Macaranga capensis and Newbutonia macrocalyx and runs to the east side of the range. The region is also host to the valuable commercial species including Pouteria adolfi-friedericii, Ocotea usambarensis and Syzygium guineense, which are the most conspicuous forest in the Kikuyu escarpment.

Xeromorphic evergreen forest
Located on the dry northern and western slopes of Aberdares, it has several species with the most notable being the olives (Olea europaea, Olea capensis, Olea hochstetteri), podo (Podocarpus milanjianus), and cedar (Juniperus procera).

Sub-montane forest
This forms the seasonal forest cover on the north-east slopes with predominantly Ekebergia capensis, Nuxia congesta, Cassipourea malossana and Calodendrum capense (Cape chestnut) species.

Events
The Aberdare Range was named by Joseph Thomson in 1884 in honour of Lord Aberdare, who at the time was president of the Royal Geographical Society and the Royal Historical Society. Aberdare was also a Liberal politician who had served as Home Secretary from 1868 to 1873. He was later to become the first chancellor of the University of Wales.

The area is well known as the headquarters of Dedan Kimathi, leader of the 1950s Mau Mau Uprising. Elizabeth II became Queen of the United Kingdom while staying at Treetops Hotel in the Aberdares.

It was also the site where J.A. Hunter killed the rogue elephant of Aberdare Forest.

Footnotes

External links
 The Aberdare Mountain Ranges (Nyandarua Range)

Mountain ranges of Kenya
Great Rift Valley
Nyandarua County
East African montane forests